The 2020 Surabaya mayoral election was held on 9 December 2020, as part of the 2020 simultaneous local elections across Indonesia.

Candidates
Two candidates ran in the election:
 Eri Cahyadi, senior municipal bureaucrat most recently head of the Surabaya's municipal development planning board, endorsed by PDI-P and PSI,
 Machfud Arifin, former chief of East Java's regional police, endorsed by a coalition of eight political parties represented in the city council.

Nominations
Cahyadi, who had worked under the current incumbent mayor Tri Rismaharini, received endorsements from Rismaharini's previous campaign team, and later on Rismaharini also participated in campaigning for Cahyadi. His running mate Armudji was a member of the East Java Regional People's Representative Council, and used to be speaker of the Surabaya city council.

Arifin's running mate was Mujiaman, formerly president director of the municipal water company.

Campaign
Two rounds of public debates were held between the candidates on 4 and 18 November 2020. In terms of reported campaign donations, the Eri-Armudji ticket received Rp 1.8 billion, while the Machfud-Mujiaman ticket received Rp 7.3 billion. On 1 December 2020, the Surabaya branch of PDI-P filed a report against the Machfud-Mujiaman campaign team for using Rismaharini's imagery in campaigning material while she had declared her support for the Eri-Armudji ticket.

A number of survey organizations conducted opinion polls regarding the mayoral election, with differing results.

References

Elections in East Java
Surabaya
Surabaya
Mayoral elections in Indonesia
December 2020 events in Indonesia